Tsugi may refer to:

Ghost-Cat of Gojusan-Tsugi, a 1956 Japanese film directed by Bin Kado
Tōkaidō Gojūsan-tsugi (video game), side-scrolling action-adventure game from Sunsoft
Thomas Tsugi (born c. 1571), Japanese Jesuit preacher
Tsugi Takano, female novelist from Hamamatsu in Shizuoka prefecture, Japan